Indonesia sent a delegation to compete at the 2008 Summer Paralympics in Beijing. The country sent three athletes to compete in three sports.

Sports

Powerlifting

Swimming

Wheelchair tennis

See also
Indonesia at the Paralympics
Indonesia at the 2008 Summer Olympics

External links
Beijing 2008 Paralympic Games Official Site
International Paralympic Committee

References

Nations at the 2008 Summer Paralympics
2008
Paralympics